A Bachelor of Forensic Psychology (also referred to as Industrial Psychology) is a type of postgraduate academic Bachelor's degree awarded by universities in many countries. This degree is typically studied for in Forensic psychology.

Curriculum structure
A Bachelor of Arts or Science in Forensic Psychology is a four-year bachelor's degree, depending on the program, forensic psychology may be offered as a concentration to a traditional bachelor's degree in psychology.

Topics of study may include:
 Adversarial system
 Competency evaluation (law)
 Criminal law
 Criminal responsibility
 Element (criminal law)
 Forensic Science
 Forensic psychiatry
 Hearsay evidence
 Justice system
 Mitigating factors
 Settled insanity
 Ultimate issue

Institutions with forensic psychology degree programs
Institutions in the United States that have a Bachelor's in Forensic Psychology Degree Program include:
 Barry University
 Florida Institute of Technology
 St. John's University
 Arizona State University
 Southern New Hampshire University
 University of North Dakota
 Maryville University
 Walden University
 University of Denver
 Argosy University
 John Jay College of Criminal Justice

See also
 Applied Psychology
 Archuleta v. Hedrick
 Crime Classification Manual
 Dusky v. United States
 List of tagged degrees
 List of United States Supreme Court cases involving mental health
 Outline of psychology
 United States v. Binion

References

Arts in Forensic Psychology
Psychology education